Rail transport in North Korea is provided by Korean State Railway (조선 민주주의 인민 공화국 철도성, Chosŏn Minjujuŭi Inmin Konghwaguk Ch'ŏldosŏng) which is the only rail operator in North Korea. It has a network of over 6,000 km of track, of which the vast majority is standard gauge; there is, however, nearly 400 km of narrow-gauge lines (762 mm) in various locations around the country.

Routes

In many cases, the name of the line is a portmanteau of the original termini. However, because of the division of Korea, some lines now terminate short of their original destinations. The following lists the main standard-gauge trunk lines:

 Hambuk Line: Ch'ŏngjin Ch'ŏngnyŏn - Rajin, 331.1 km, 
 Kangwŏn Line: Kowŏn - P'yŏnggang, 145.8 km, 
 Manp'o Line: Sunch'ŏn - Manp'o, 299.9 km, 
 Paektusan Ch'ŏngnyŏn Line: Kilchu Ch'ŏngnyŏn - Hyesan Ch'ŏngnyŏn, 141.7 km, 
 P'yŏngbu Line: P'yŏngyang - Kaesŏng (-> Dorasan, ROK), 187.3 km, 
 P'yŏngdŏk Line: P'yŏngyang - Kusang Ch'ŏngnyŏn, 192.3 km, 
 P'yŏngnam Line: P'yŏngyang - Namp'o, 55.2 km, 
 P'yŏngra Line: P'yŏngyang - Rajin (and on to Khasan, Russia), 819.0 km, 
 P'yŏngŭi Line: P'yŏngyang - Sinŭiju (and on to Dandong, China), 225.1 km,

Stations

Pyongyang Metro
The Pyongyang Metro operates the only known underground mass transit in North Korea. Metro services are also supplemented with above-ground tram services in both Pyongyang and a number of secondary cities.

International services

China
The primary rail gateway to North Korea is via the Sino–Korean Friendship Bridge from Dandong, China to Sinuiju, North Korea. Passenger trains are taken as far as Dandong by the China Railway at which point the domestic Chinese carriages are uncoupled and North Korean carriages and locomotive are attached. There are several other active border crossings with China, including at Manp'o and at Namyang.

Russia
Rajin has a rail link to the Russian Railways system over the Friendship Bridge across the Tumen River in the North Korea–Russia border. There is transborder passenger service from Pyongyang to Moscow, with a Korean rail car taken across the border (with bogies changed to the Russian gauge), and eventually attached to a Vladivostok-Moscow train.

Since 2013 the line over the Tumen River to Rajin is rebuilt with dual gauge track, so that standard gauge and Russian broad gauge trains from the Russian Khasan can access the port of Rajin. Railway and port are operated in a joint venture with the Russian RasonKonTrans.

South Korea
In 2000, a freight service was inaugurated, between South Korea and the industrial park at Kaesong; however, usage has been very low and most trains carry no freight.

Rolling stock

Presidential trains

Future plans
A Trans-Korean Main Line is planned, spanning North Korea and allowing South Korean rail freight access to Russian Railways.

Gallery

History

Much of the rail network in Korea was built during the period of Japanese rule, which ended in 1945. Much was damaged or destroyed during the Korean War.

See also

 Rail transport in South Korea
 Transport in North Korea

References